Events in the year 2020 in Tunisia.

Incumbents
 President: Kais Saied
 Prime Minister
Youssef Chahed (until February 27, 2020)
Elyes Fakhfakh (February 27, 2020 – September 2, 2020)
Hichem Mechichi (since September 2, 2020)
 President of the Assembly of the Representatives by the People: Rached Ghannouchi

Events
January 14 – Revolution and Youth Day (2011)
February 3 – President Kais Saied visits Algeria in his first trip outside the country.
February 9 – 1,200 runners participate in a half-Marathon (21 kilometers) in Djerba, Tunisia.
February 17 – President Kais Saied says he will call early elections if a parliamentary stalemate is not resolved by February 21. He calls this the worst political crisis since 1956.
March 6 – Suicide bombing outside U.S. Embassy in Tunis
March 20 – Independence Day (1956 from France)
July 15 – Prime Minister Elyes Fakhfakh resigns over an alleged conflict of interest.
July 25 - Hichem Mechichi, the Minister of the Interior is chosen as Prime Minister.

Sports

January 16 – January 26: 2020 African Men's Handball Championship: Egypt won their seventh title by defeating Tunisia 27–23 in the final.
February 9 – 1,200 runners participate in half-Marathon (21 kilometers) in Djerba, Tunisia.

Deaths

January to April
January 7 – Abderrazak Rassaa, politician (b. 1930)
January 21 – Hédi Baccouche, politician (b. 1930)
January 27 – Lina Ben Mhenni, 36, political activist and blogger (b. 1983).
February 10 – Saïd Amara, 75, handball player and coach (Espérance Sportive de Tunis, National Team)
March 6 – Lieutenant Taoufik Mohammed El Nissaoui, 52, police officer killed during terrorist attack
March 27 – Hamed Karoui, 92, politician, Prime Minister (1989–1999) and Minister of Justice (1988–1989)
April 4 – Leïla Menchari, 93, decorator and designer, COVID-19
April 20 – Noureddine Diwa, 83, footballer (Stade Tunisien, Limoges, national team)

May to August
May 13 – Chedli Klibi, 94, politician, Minister of Culture (1961–1970, 1971–1973, 1976–1978) and Secretary-General of the Arab League (1979–1990).
July 8 – Abdelmajid Tlemçani, 82–83, footballer (Espérance Sportive de Tunis, national team).
July 27 – Radhi Jazi, 92, Tunisian pharmacist.
July 28 – Gisèle Halimi, 93, Tunisian-French lawyer and feminist.
August 11 – Salah Chaoua, 73, footballer (Club Africain, Al-Madina SC, National Team).
August 17 – Ali Chaouch, 72, politician, Minister of the Interior (1997–1999).
August 21
Mohamed Ben Rehaiem, 69, footballer (Sfaxien, Al-Nassr, national team).
Mohamed Gueddiche, 78, cardiologist, presidential doctor.

September to December
16 September – Ahmed Ben Salah, 94, politician, Minister of Finance (1961–1969).
7 October – Nabil Bechaouch, 49–50, footballer (Olympique Béja, national team).
14 October – Éric Assous, 64, Tunisian-born French film director, screenwriter (The Banned Woman, The Girl from Paris, 22 Bullets) and dramatist.
18 October – Naâma, 84, singer.
23 October – Abderrahmane Rahmouni, 75, footballer (Club Africain).
18 December – Yazid Zerhouni, 83, Tunisian-born Algerian politician.
24 December – At least twenty migrants drown when their boat capsizes near Sfax.
26 December – Gilbert Naccache, 81, writer and far-left militant.
27 December – Zouheïra Salem, 80, singer.

See also

2020 in North Africa
COVID-19 pandemic in Africa
COVID-19 pandemic in Tunisia
2020s
African Union
Arab League
List of terrorist incidents in Tunisia

References

 
Tunisia
2020s in Tunisia
Years of the 21st century in Tunisia
Tunisia